Clayton Edward Kershaw  (born March 19, 1988) is an American professional baseball pitcher for the Los Angeles Dodgers of Major League Baseball (MLB). A left-handed starting pitcher, Kershaw has spent his entire 15-season major league career with the Dodgers since debuting in 2008. He is a nine-time All-Star, three-time National League (NL) Cy Young Award winner, the 2014 NL Most Valuable Player, and a World Series champion in 2020. His 2.48 career earned run average (ERA) and 1.00 walks plus hits per inning pitched rate (WHIP) are the lowest among starters in the live-ball era (minimum 1,000 innings pitched). Kershaw has a career hits allowed per nine innings pitched average of 6.82, the third-lowest in MLB history. He has been described for much of his career as the best pitcher in baseball, and one of the greatest pitchers of all time.

Kershaw was drafted seventh overall in the 2006 MLB draft. He worked his way through the Dodgers' farm system in just one full season and reached the majors at 20 years old. When he debuted in 2008, he was the youngest player in MLB, a title he held for one full year. In 2011, he won the pitching Triple Crown and the NL Cy Young Award, becoming the youngest pitcher to accomplish either of these feats since Dwight Gooden in 1985.

During the 2013 offseason, the Dodgers signed Kershaw to a franchise record seven-year, $215 million contract extension. Kershaw pitched a no-hitter on June 18, 2014, becoming the 22nd Dodger to do so. Being a left-handed strikeout pitcher and playing for the Dodgers has drawn Kershaw comparisons to Hall of Fame pitcher Sandy Koufax. He has led MLB in ERA five times, and was the first major league pitcher to do so in four consecutive years (2011–2014). Kershaw is also a three-time NL wins leader and three-time NL strikeouts leader.

Off the field, Kershaw is an active participant in volunteer work. He and his wife Ellen launched "Kershaw's Challenge" and wrote the book Arise to raise money to build an orphanage in Zambia. He has been honored with the Roberto Clemente Award and the Branch Rickey Award for his humanitarian work.

Early life
Kershaw was born in Dallas, Texas. His parents divorced when he was 10, and he was raised by his mother. He played in youth sports leagues as a child, including Little League Baseball.

Kershaw attended nearby Highland Park High School, where he played baseball and was also the center for future NFL quarterback Matthew Stafford on the varsity football team. After a growth spurt and further development of his pitches, he established himself as an elite high school prospect in 2006 when he posted a 13–0 record with an earned run average (ERA) of 0.77, and recorded 139 strikeouts in 64 innings pitched. In a playoff game against Northwest High School of Justin, Texas, Kershaw pitched an all-strikeout perfect game. He struck out all 15 batters he faced in the game, which was shortened because of the mercy rule. He also hit a grand slam. He also pitched for USA Baseball's Junior National Team in the Pan Am Championship. Kershaw was selected by USA Today as "High School Baseball Player of the Year", and was also the Gatorade National Player of the Year for baseball.

Entering the 2006 MLB draft, Kershaw was considered the consensus top high school pitcher available. The Los Angeles Dodgers selected Kershaw with the seventh overall pick in the draft. He had committed to Texas A&M University, but turned down the scholarship offer to sign with the Dodgers, with a bonus estimated at $2.3 million.  At the time, it was the largest bonus conferred to any Dodgers draft pick, and remained so until it was topped by the $5.25 million that Zach Lee, another Texas high school pitcher, earned from the 2010 draft.

Professional career

Draft and minor leagues
Kershaw began his career with the Gulf Coast League (GCL) Dodgers. He pitched 37 innings in which he struck out 54 batters (walking only five), while compiling a record of 2–0 with a 1.95 ERA.

Kershaw was promoted to the Great Lakes Loons in 2007, with whom he recorded a record of 7–5 with a 2.77 ERA. He was selected to play on the East Team in the Midwest League All-Star Game and on the USA team in the All-Star Futures Game. On August 6, he was promoted to the Double-A Jacksonville Suns in the Southern League, where he produced a 1–2 record and 3.65 ERA in five starts and was selected as the top prospect in the Dodgers organization heading into the 2008 season.

During spring training in a game against the Boston Red Sox, Kershaw gained much attention for throwing a curveball to Sean Casey that started behind Casey but at the end looped into the strike zone and struck him out looking. Kershaw was 0–3 and had a 2.28 ERA with 47 strikeouts through  innings pitched in his first stint of the year with the Suns. He was then called up to the majors on May 28, 2008, but optioned back to Jacksonville on July 2.

Kershaw pitched 18 innings during his second trip to Jacksonville (two starts and one seven-inning relief appearance), winning two games. During this stretch, he allowed only two earned runs, lowering his ERA to 1.91. He was recalled on July 22.

Los Angeles Dodgers (2008–present)

2008–2010 seasons: Early career

On May 24, 2008, the Dodgers bought Kershaw's minor-league contract, and he was added to the active roster. Sportswriter Tony Jackson called Kershaw's debut the most anticipated start by a Dodgers pitcher since Hideo Nomo's MLB debut during the 1995 season. He made his MLB debut on May 25, starting against the St. Louis Cardinals. He struck out the first batter he faced, Skip Schumaker, the first of seven strikeouts in the game, in which he pitched six innings and allowed two runs. When he debuted, Kershaw was the youngest player in MLB, a title he held for one full year.

Kershaw won his first MLB game against the Washington Nationals on July 27, 2008. He pitched six-plus shutout innings, allowing four hits, a walk, and he struck out five. Kershaw finished his rookie season 5–5, with a 4.26 ERA in 22 games (21 starts). He also pitched two innings out of the bullpen for the Dodgers in the 2008 National League Championship Series (NLCS) against the Philadelphia Phillies.

On April 15, 2009, Kershaw pitched seven innings, striking out 13 batters while allowing only one hit (a solo home run) against the rival San Francisco Giants. He was the youngest Dodger to ever strikeout 13 or more batters in a game since Sandy Koufax did it in the 1955 season. On May 17, 2009, Kershaw did not allow a hit against the Florida Marlins through 7 innings, then gave up a lead-off double to Florida's Cody Ross. In 2009, despite an 8–8 record, he led the major leagues in opposing batting average (.200), opposing slugging percentage (.282), and hits per nine innings (6.26). He also posted an ERA of 2.79 and 185 strikeouts. Kershaw also walked 91 batters, which was second most in the National League (NL).

Kershaw made his playoff starting debut against the St. Louis Cardinals in the 2009 National League Division Series (NLDS). He went  innings, striking out 4, walking 1, and ended up getting a no-decision (the Dodgers went on to win the game in the 9th inning). At 21 years old, he started the opener of the 2009 NLCS against the Philadelphia Phillies and was the third youngest pitcher to ever start a playoff series opener, behind only Fernando Valenzuela in the 1981 NLDS and Rick Ankiel in the 2000 NLDS.

Kershaw started the 2010 season by posting a 3.07 ERA in April but did so by walking 22 batters in 29 innings. On May 4, he had the worst start of his career against the Milwaukee Brewers at Dodger Stadium, throwing just 57 pitches in  innings while retiring only four of the 13 batters he faced—including the pitcher. He was booed loudly upon being pulled from the game. Kershaw said after the game, "I didn't give our team any kind of chance. It's just not a good feeling to let your teammates down, let everybody down. It stings, it hurts. I've got to figure things out."

Kershaw rebounded his next start by pitching an 8-inning two-hitter and outdueling the then undefeated Ubaldo Jiménez. He credited his control of the slider being the major turning point for him. Later in the season, he was suspended for five games after hitting Aaron Rowand of the Giants with a pitch in a game on July 20. The incident occurred after both teams were given a warning following Giants ace Tim Lincecum hitting Matt Kemp earlier in the game. He threw his first career complete game shutout on September 14, 2010, also against San Francisco and finished the season with a record of 13–10 and a 2.91 ERA in 32 starts, pitching  innings and recording 212 strikeouts.

2011 season: 1st Cy Young Award
After finishing the 2010 season strong, the Dodgers named Kershaw as the Opening Day Starter for the 2011 season. On May 29, he pitched the second complete-game shutout of his career, striking out 10 while winning a two-hitter against the Florida Marlins, 8–0; he also had two singles and an RBI, scoring twice in the game. He produced his third career shutout on June 20, a two-hit, 11-strikeout effort against the Detroit Tigers, and became the first Dodgers starter to strike out the side in the 9th inning since Sandy Koufax's perfect game in 1965.

In his next start, on June 26, Kershaw pitched another complete game (against the Los Angeles Angels of Anaheim). He became the first Dodger starter to have back-to-back complete-game victories since Jeff Weaver in the 2005 season and the first Dodger to have double-digit strikeouts in consecutive starts since Chan Ho Park in the 2000 season. He was awarded the National League Player of the Week award for the week of June 20–26 as a result of those two starts. Midway through June, Kershaw had amassed 32 career victories, a 3.15 ERA and 593 career strikeouts in 568.2 innings. According to the Elias Sports Bureau, Kershaw was the first 23-year-old pitcher to have that many victories, an ERA that low and an average of more than one strikeout per inning since ERA became an official statistic in 1910.

Kershaw was selected to the National League team for the 2011 Major League Baseball All-Star Game, his first All-Star selection. In the month of July, Kershaw was 4–1 with a 2.02 ERA and NL-leading 45 strikeouts, earning him the National League Pitcher of the Month Award. On August 23, he struck out Matt Holliday of the St. Louis Cardinals for his 200th strikeout of the season and became the 10th Dodger pitcher to record back-to-back 200 strikeout seasons and the first since Chan-Ho Park did it in the 2001 season.

Over the course of the season, Kershaw pitched opposite two-time Cy Young Award winner and three-time defending NL strikeout leader Tim Lincecum of the San Francisco Giants in four particularly memorable matchups. Lincecum posted a 1.24 ERA over 29 innings in the four games but failed to record a win, as Kershaw countered with a 0.30 ERA over  innings and was the winning pitcher in each game. Each game was decided by a final score of 1–0 or 2–1, with many writers describing the matchups as historic and reminiscent of epic pitching duels of bygone eras.

Kershaw finished the 2011 season by leading the NL with 21 wins, 248 strikeouts, and a 2.28 ERA, winning the NL pitching Triple Crown, the first Triple Crown winner since Jake Peavy of the 2007 San Diego Padres and the first Dodger since Sandy Koufax won it in the 1966 season. Justin Verlander of the Detroit Tigers won the American League Triple Crown the same season, marking the first major-league season since 1924 to feature Triple Crown-winning pitchers in both leagues. Kershaw's 21 wins were the most by a Dodger pitcher since Orel Hershiser won 23 during the 1988 season. His ERA was the lowest by a Dodger since Hershiser's 2.03 in the 1985 season, his strikeouts were the most by a Dodger since Koufax's 317 in 1966 and his  innings pitched were the most since Chan Ho Park pitched 234 in 2001. Since 1965 when Koufax did it, Peavy and Kershaw are only two pitchers in the National League have led the league in wins, strikeouts, ERA, and WHIP (walks plus hits per inning pitched). Kershaw also became just the second left-hander to have a 240-plus strikeouts in a season before the age of 24, joining Vida Blue.

After the season, Kershaw was awarded the Warren Spahn Award as the best left-handed pitcher in 2011, the Players Choice Award for Most Outstanding National League pitcher, the Gold Glove Award as the top fielding pitcher in the NL and the Sporting News (TSN) National League Pitcher of the Year. He was additionally selected as the starting pitcher for the TSN NL All-Star Team. On November 17, he was honored with the National League Cy Young Award, making him the youngest Cy Young winner since Dwight Gooden of the 1985 New York Mets. He was the 8th Dodger pitcher to win the award, the first since Éric Gagné in the 2003 season.

2012 season: Cy Young runner-up
On February 7, 2012, Kershaw and the Dodgers agreed on a two-year, $19 million contract. The contract was the second highest for a player in his first year of arbitration (after Tim Lincecum's $23 million 2-year contract in 2010).

Kershaw was the Dodgers' Opening Day starter for the second year in a row, where he pitched three innings of shutout ball against the San Diego Padres at Petco Park before being removed from the game due to flu-like symptoms. On April 27, he was able to last through eight innings for his second win of the season against the Washington Nationals. The win was also his 12th straight home win, tying him with Ed Roebuck (June 1960 – August 1962) and Orel Hershiser (September 1984 – October 1985) for the longest home winning streak since the Dodgers moved to Los Angeles. Kershaw won the National League's Player of the Week Award for the week of May 14–20 after he made two starts during that week and pitched 16 scoreless innings, including his fourth career shutout. Kershaw was selected to appear in the 2012 Major League Baseball All-Star Game, the second straight year he made the team.

On August 11, he went over 200 innings on the season, becoming the 12th Los Angeles Dodger pitcher with three or more seasons of 200 or more innings, and the first since Hershiser did it five times from 1985 to 1989. Kershaw also became just the fifth Dodger pitcher with three straight 200 strikeout seasons.

Kershaw finished 2012 with a 14–9 record, a 2.53 ERA (leading the league), 229 strikeouts, and  innings pitched, coming second in both categories. He became the first pitcher to lead the league in ERA in consecutive seasons since Arizona's Randy Johnson in 2001–02. This was also marked his fourth year in a row with a sub-3.00 ERA, making him the first to do this since Randy Johnson from 1999 to 2002. He finished second for the NL Cy Young behind R. A. Dickey, receiving two first-place votes.

2013 season: 2nd Cy Young Award
Kershaw made his third straight opening day start for the Dodgers in the 2013 season, the first Dodger starter to do so since Derek Lowe (2005–2007). In that opening day start, he pitched a complete game, four-hit, 4-0 shutout over the Giants, having also scored the first run of the game, a solo home run which was his first and so far only home run of his career. He was the first pitcher to throw a shutout and hit a home run on opening day since Bob Lemon of the Cleveland Indians did so against the Chicago White Sox on April 14, 1953. Kershaw picked up his 1,000th career strikeout on April 17, 2013, when he struck out Yonder Alonso of the Padres. He was the second youngest Dodger to reach that mark, behind only Fernando Valenzuela. On May 14, Kershaw passed the 1,000 inning mark for his career. His ERA of 2.70 at the time was the fifth-best of the live-ball era at the 1,000 inning mark and the best career mark. He also threw 130 pitches that day, the most of his career and the most by a Dodger pitcher since Odalis Pérez in the 2003 season.

Kershaw was selected to the 2013 Major League Baseball All-Star Game, his third straight selection. In July, he compiled a 4–1 record and 1.34 ERA in six starts and was awarded his second National League Pitcher of the Month Award. On September 2, Kershaw picked up his 200th strikeout of 2013, joining Hall of Famers Sandy Koufax and Don Drysdale as the only starters in Dodgers history with at least four consecutive seasons of more than 200 strikeouts.

Kershaw finished the season with a 16–9 record, 236 innings pitched (a career-high), and a Major League-best 1.83 ERA and 0.92 WHIP.  He was the third player in history to lead the Majors in ERA three years in a row, joining Greg Maddux (1993–95) and Lefty Grove (1929–31). His ERA was the first sub-2.00 ERA since Roger Clemens did it in the 2005 season and the lowest overall since Pedro Martínez in the 2000 season. He was only the third Dodger pitcher to have an ERA under 3.00 in five consecutive seasons (Koufax and Nap Rucker).

Kershaw struck out 12 batters in seven innings in the first game of the 2013 National League Division Series. That was the third most strikeouts by a Dodger pitcher in the playoffs, behind only Koufax (15 in the 1963 World Series) and Carl Erskine (14 in the 1953 World Series). His six straight strikeouts in the game tied an MLB postseason record set by Tim Belcher in the second game of the 1988 World Series. He picked up his first career postseason victory in that game.

Kershaw won the Warren Spahn Award for 2013, the second time he had won the award, which honors the best left-handed pitcher in the Major Leagues. He was also selected to the Sporting News NL All-Star team, the fourth Dodger pitcher to be named to the team twice (after Koufax, Valenzuela and Don Newcombe). On November 13, he won the NL Cy Young Award for the second time in three seasons. He became just the sixth pitcher in history to finish in the top two in voting three seasons in a row.

After the season, Kershaw and the Dodgers agreed on a seven-year, $215 million, contract extension. The deal was the richest in MLB history for a pitcher, eclipsing the seven-year, $180 million, contract signed by Justin Verlander the previous year. The average annual value of $30.7 million was also the largest ever for a baseball player, beating the $28 million Roger Clemens received in 2007 and the 10-year, $275 million contract that Alex Rodriguez signed that same year.

2014 season: 3rd Cy Young Award and National League MVP

Kershaw made his fourth straight opening day start for the Dodgers in 2014, only the fourth Dodger ever to do so. This season the game was played at the Sydney Cricket Ground in Australia. Before his second start, Kershaw felt some pain in his back and was placed on the disabled list for the first time in his career. He did not rejoin the Dodgers until early May. On June 18, he pitched a complete game no-hitter against the Colorado Rockies and struck out a career-high 15 batters. The only batter to reach base was due to an error by Hanley Ramirez in the top of the seventh inning, costing Kershaw a perfect game. He is one of two pitchers in MLB history, along with Max Scherzer, with 15 strikeouts in a game while allowing no hits and no walks. Kershaw was 6–0 with an 0.82 ERA in June and was awarded his third career Pitcher of the Month award. He was selected to the National League squad at the 2014 Major League Baseball All-Star Game, his fourth straight selection. He was the sixth Dodger pitcher, and the first since Fernando Valenzuela to make the All-Star team four years in a row.

Kershaw had a 41-inning scoreless streak that ended in the top of the sixth inning on July 10 when, with two outs, Chase Headley homered to left field at Dodger Stadium. Kershaw's streak was, at the time, tied for the fifteenth longest scoreless inning streak in MLB history. He won the pitcher of the month award again in July, the third Dodger (along with Don Sutton and Burt Hooton) to win it two months in a row. He was 4–0 with a 1.10 ERA in the month with 48 strikeouts and only 10 walks. He picked up his 200th strikeout of the season on September 2, the fifth year in a row he had reached that number, trailing only the six seasons in a row for Sandy Koufax among Dodger starters. He also became just the fourth pitcher since 1893 to have at least five 200-strikeout seasons through an age-26 season (Bert Blyleven, Walter Johnson and Sam McDowell are the others).

Kershaw finished the season 21–3 with a 1.77 ERA in 27 starts. He led the National League in numerous categories once again, such as ERA, ERA+, Wins, Win %, WHIP, IP/GS, SO/9, Strikeout-to-walk ratio, complete games, FIP, and Wins Above Replacement for both pitchers and all NL players. He also finished third in strikeouts despite missing most of the first month of the season. He was the first pitcher in history to win four consecutive ERA titles. Many experts called his 2014 season one of the best pitching seasons in recent memory.

However, in his first start of the playoffs, in Game 1 of the Division Series against the Cardinals, Kershaw became the first pitcher in history to strike out 10 while allowing eight runs. He had cruised through the first six innings while allowing only two hits (both solo homers) and surrendered six runs in the seventh. He did tie Koufax for the only Dodgers pitchers with multiple double-digit strikeout games in the playoffs. He was also the first pitcher in history to give up at least seven runs in back-to-back postseason starts (his previous one was Game 6 of the 2013 National League Championship Series).  Pitching on short rest in Game 4, he would again be dominant, but again would take the loss after giving up a 3-run home run to Matt Adams in the 7th inning. It was the first home run Kershaw had allowed in his career to a left-handed batter off his curveball.

Kershaw was honored after the season with the player of the year awards from both The Sporting News and Baseball America. He won three awards at the Players Choice Awards including Outstanding NL Pitcher, Player of the Year and the Marvin Miller Man of the Year Award. He also won his third (and second straight) Warren Spahn Award. On November 12, he was awarded his third Cy Young Award in four seasons (a unanimous vote). The following day, he was elected as the NL MVP, the first National League pitcher to win the award since Bob Gibson in 1968 and the first Dodgers player to win the award since Kirk Gibson in 1988.

2015 season: 300-strikeout season

Kershaw made his fifth straight opening day start in 2015, the first Dodgers pitcher to do so since Hall of Famer Don Sutton started seven in a row from 1972 through 1978. He recorded his 1,500th career strikeout on May 10 when he fanned Drew Stubbs of the Colorado Rockies. Kershaw picked up his 100th career win on May 15 against the Rockies. He became the 22nd pitcher in franchise history, and the second-youngest active pitcher to reach that mark. Kershaw won his sixth career NL Player of the Week award for the week of June 1–7, 2015, when he allowed only two runs on 10 baserunners in 15 innings while striking out 18 in two starts.

Kershaw did not make the initial NL roster for the 2015 All-Star Game, though he was included on the Final Vote ballot, which he lost to Cardinals pitcher Carlos Martinez. However, he was added to the roster to replace Nationals pitcher Max Scherzer, who was unavailable due to pitching the Sunday before the game. It became his fifth straight all-star selection, joining Sandy Koufax and Fernando Valenzuela as the only Dodgers pitchers to accomplish that feat.

Kershaw struck out a season-high 14 batters in eight shutout innings on July 18 against the Washington Nationals. He became the first Dodgers starter with back-to-back games of at least 13 strikeouts since Chan Ho Park in 2000, and the first Dodgers pitcher with back-to-back games of double-digit strikeouts and no walks since Dazzy Vance in 1930. He shared the NL Player of the Week honors with his teammate Zack Greinke for the week of July 13–19 and won NL Pitcher of the Month for July.

Kershaw picked up his 200th strikeout of the season on August 12, tying Hideo Nomo's 1995 season for the fastest to that mark in Dodgers history at 156 innings. This was the sixth straight 200 strikeout season for Kershaw, tying Sandy Koufax for the most in Dodgers franchise history. On October 4, Kershaw became the 11th player in Major League history to strike out 300 batters in a season, the first player since Randy Johnson did it in 2002. He finished the season with a 16–7 record, a 2.13 ERA, and 301 strikeouts in  innings. He led the major leagues in pickoffs, with nine.

In Game One of the 2015 National League Division Series, Kershaw struck out 11 in  innings but allowed three runs for his fifth straight postseason loss. He and New York Mets starter Jacob deGrom were the first pair of starters to each throw at least 11 strikeouts in the same postseason game in MLB history. He rebounded in game four, earning the win on three days' rest by allowing one run and three hits against eight strikeouts in seven innings on October 13. Kershaw finished third in the National League Cy Young Award voting, placing behind teammate Zack Greinke and eventual winner Jake Arrieta.

2016 season: Injury-plagued year

Kershaw made his sixth straight opening day start in 2016 as the Dodgers won 15–0. It also marked the first time the Dodgers had won six straight opening day games, all of which he started. On May 12 against the New York Mets, he struck out 13 while pitching a three-hit complete-game shutout.

He set an MLB record with six consecutive starts with at least 10 strikeouts and no more than one walk and a club record with six consecutive starts with at least 10 strikeouts. He picked up his 100th strikeout on May 29, while only walking five batters within that period. That was the lowest walk total for a pitcher reaching 100 strikeouts in the modern era, beating Cliff Lee who had seven walks in the 2010 season. On June 30, 2016, Kershaw was placed on the 15-day disabled list due to back pain. He received an MRI, which revealed that there was a mild herniated disc in the back, and received an epidural injection to treat the pain.

He was named to the 2016 All-Star team but was unable to pitch in the game due to his injury. On July 20, the Dodgers shut down Kershaw for an indefinite period of time. He continued to feel discomfort in his back after a simulated game. On August 3, Kershaw was transferred to the 60-day disabled list. He rejoined the Dodger rotation on September 9.

He started 21 games in 2016, with a 12–4 record and 1.69 ERA. He also struck out 172 batters with only 11 walks.

Kershaw started games one and four of the 2016 National League Division Series  and picked up the save in the clinching game five. It was his first professional save since he was with the Gulf Coast Dodgers in his first minor league season in 2006. He next pitched seven shutout innings, allowing only two hits, in Game two of the 2016 National League Championship Series against the Chicago Cubs. He struggled in Game Six, allowing five runs in five innings to pick up the loss as the Dodgers were eliminated from post-season contention.

2017 season: First World Series appearance
Kershaw made his seventh straight Opening Day start, tying Don Sutton for most consecutive Opening Day starts, and Sutton and Don Drysdale for most total opening day starts by a Dodger. On June 2, he struck out Jonathan Villar of the Milwaukee Brewers for his 2,000th career strikeout. He was the fifth-youngest player in major league history to reach that mark, as well as the second-fastest pitcher to 2,000 strikeouts, accomplishing the feat in 277 games (behind Randy Johnson's 262 games). He was named to his seventh straight all-star game, second most in Dodgers history after Drysdale. On July 23, Kershaw left the game due to back tightness. The same day, he was placed on the 10-day disabled list. He returned to the mound on September 1, but despite his extended absence, he went on to lead the National League in earned run average and wins.

In 27 starts, he was 18–4 with a 2.31 ERA and 202 strikeouts.  He led all major league pitchers in left on base percentage, stranding 87.4% of base runners. He also led all major league pitchers in first-strike percentage (69.4%).

In the opener of the 2017 NLDS against the Arizona Diamondbacks, he allowed four solo home runs in  innings but still picked up the win. The four home runs were tied for the most allowed in a postseason game. He made two starts in the 2017 NLCS against the Chicago Cubs, both Dodgers wins, including the clinching game five. He allowed three runs in 11 innings in the two games with nine strikeouts and only two walks. Kershaw started the opening game of the 2017 World Series for the Dodgers against the Houston Astros. He struck out 11 batters in the game without walking anyone and only allowed one run (a solo homer) on three hits to pick up the win. His 11 strikeouts were the third most ever by a Dodgers pitcher in a World Series game, after Sandy Koufax (15 in 1963) and Carl Erskine (14 in 1953). He made another start in the fifth game of the series, but he did not pitch as well this time, allowing six runs on four hits in  innings. Notably, he threw 39 sliders and generated only one swing and miss all game. Although he received criticism after this start for his continued postseason struggles, the later revelation of the Houston Astros sign stealing scandal as a possible factor has complicated assessments of his performance in this game. He came back in game seven to pitch four scoreless innings of relief in the game, and in the process, he broke Orel Hershiser's Dodgers post-season record with his 33rd strikeout. However, the Dodgers lost the game and the series.

Kershaw was selected as a starting pitcher on Baseball America'''s All-MLB Team and finished second in the NL Cy Young Award voting.

2018 season: Second World Series appearance
Kershaw made his team-record eighth opening-day start in 2018. He allowed only one run in six innings with seven strikeouts against the Giants, but still lost the game 1–0. It was his first opening-day loss. On May 6, Kershaw was placed on the disabled list due to left biceps tendinitis. He returned to the team for one start on May 31, during which he experienced a recurrence of his chronic back pain and was put back on the disabled list. He rejoined the roster on June 23. He had a record of 9–5 with a 2.73 ERA and 155 strikeouts in 2018, his lowest win total and highest ERA since 2010 and fewest strikeouts since his rookie season.

In a surprising move, Dave Roberts chose Hyun-jin Ryu to pitch the Dodgers' first playoff game of the 2018 NLDS against the Atlanta Braves. It was the first time since 2009 that Kershaw had not started the first game of the playoffs for the Dodgers. He started the second game of the series and pitched eight scoreless innings while allowing only two hits. He then started the opener of the 2018 NLCS against the Milwaukee Brewers, but turned in the shortest postseason start of his career, replaced with no outs in the fourth inning after allowing five runs on six hits and two walks. He had better results in Game 5, pitching seven innings and allowing one run on three hits and two walks while striking out nine. He also walked twice as a batter, becoming just the third pitcher in the last 20 years to do so in a postseason game (after Jon Lester in the 2016 NLCS and Derek Lowe in the 2008 NLDS).

Kershaw made two starts for the Dodgers in the 2018 World Series against the Boston Red Sox. In Game 1 he pitched four innings and gave up five runs in an 8–4 loss, and in Game 5 he pitched seven innings and allowed four runs, including three home runs as the Red Sox won the Series 4–1; it was the Dodgers' second straight World Series defeat.

Kershaw's contract allowed him to opt out and become a free agent after the 2018 season, but on November 2 he and the team agreed to a new three-year, $93 million contract. This extended his previous contract by one year and $28 million.

2019 season: More injuries and an early playoff exit
Kershaw experienced left shoulder inflammation early in spring training, causing him to be shut down and he did not begin throwing in spring until late. As a result, the Dodgers chose to place him on the injured list to begin the season, ending his Dodgers record streak of eight straight opening-day starts. He was selected to the 2019 MLB All-Star Game, his eighth all-star appearance. Kershaw picked up his 165th career win on August 14 against the Miami Marlins, tying Koufax for the most ever by a Dodger left-handed pitcher. He also struck out the first seven batters in the game, breaking a Dodger record previously held by Andy Messersmith (1973) and one short of the major league record. Kershaw picked up his 166th career win on August 20 against the Toronto Blue Jays, passing Koufax for the most wins ever by a Dodger left-handed pitcher.  That game also marked only the sixth time in his career that Kershaw gave up two home runs in the same game to the same batter, Bo Bichette, and only the first time Kershaw did so to a rookie.

Kershaw finished the 2019 regular season with a record of 16–5 with 3.03 ERA with 189 strikeouts. On offense, he led the major leagues with 15 sacrifice hits.

In the National League Division Series against the Washington Nationals, Kershaw started Game 2 and entered Game 5 in relief. In Game 2, Kershaw pitched six innings and allowed three runs in a 4–2 loss. In Game 5, he entered the game in relief of Walker Buehler with two outs in the seventh inning and struck out Adam Eaton. In the eighth inning Kershaw allowed home runs on back-to-back pitches to Anthony Rendon and Juan Soto to surrender a 3–1 lead, and the Nationals won the game and the series.

2020 season: World Series championship
Kershaw was scheduled to start on opening day in the season shorted by the COVID-19 pandemic, but he hurt his back in the weight room and was placed on the injured list to start the season. Instead, rookie Dustin May got his first opening Day nod. On August 20, he passed Don Drysdale for the second-most strikeouts in franchise history. Kershaw started 10 games for the Dodgers in 2020, with a 6–2 record, 2.16 ERA and 62 strikeouts. He started the second game of the wild card series against the Milwaukee Brewers and threw eight scoreless innings while only allowing three hits and striking out 13. In the NLDS against the San Diego Padres, he also started the second game and allowed three runs in six innings while striking out six. Kershaw was scratched from his scheduled Game 2 start in the NLCS against the Atlanta Braves because of back spasms and started Game 4 instead, where he allowed four runs in five innings for his first loss of the 2020 postseason. He started the first game of the 2020 World Series against the Tampa Bay Rays, tying Greg Maddux for second place all-time with 11 Game 1 starts in the postseason. He allowed only one run in six innings in the game while striking out eight, in the process passing John Smoltz for second place all-time in postseason strikeouts with 201. Kershaw started again in Game 5, pitching  innings, allowing two runs on five hits and two walks. He struck out six in the game to pass Justin Verlander for the most strikeouts in postseason history (207). The Dodgers went on to defeat the Rays in 6 games to win Kershaw his first World Series championship. After the season, Kershaw was named to the All-MLB Second Team.

2021 season: Third injury plagued year
Kershaw made his ninth opening day start for the Dodgers, after having missed doing so the previous two seasons because of injuries. He remained in the rotation until July 7, when he was placed on the injured list with left forearm inflammation, the first time in his career he had gone on the IL with an arm injury. Initially it was hoped he would only miss a short time, but he had setbacks in his rehab which necessitated a longer stint on the injured list. He finally rejoined the Dodgers rotation on September 13, allowing only one run in  innings against the Diamondbacks. However, he experienced more arm pain in an October 1 game against the Brewers, causing him to leave the game in the second inning. An MRI showed no ligament damage, but Kershaw was placed back on the injured list and ruled out for the 2021 post-season. He started 22 games for the Dodgers during the season, with a 10–8 record and 3.55 ERA, the highest since his rookie season.

2022 season: Franchise strikeout record
On March 13, 2022, Kershaw signed a one year deal worth $17 million to return to the Dodgers. In his first start of the season, on April 13 against the Minnesota Twins, Kershaw struck out 13 batters in seven perfect innings before he was removed by the manager. Despite only being at 80 pitches, Kershaw said he agreed with the decision because he had not been built up due to a shortened spring training caused by the offseason lockout.

On April 30, Kershaw struck out Dustin Garneau of the Detroit Tigers to tie Don Sutton for the Dodgers franchise strikeout record at 2,696. One inning later, he struck out Spencer Torkelson to move past Sutton into sole possession of the record. On July 15, Kershaw had another perfect game bid against the Los Angeles Angels, where he threw seven perfect innings until it was broken up by a double by Luis Rengifo. He became the first person since 1961 to bring two perfect games into the eight inning in the same season.

Kershaw was chosen to start the 2022 Major League Baseball All-Star Game in front of his home crowd at Dodger Stadium. It was his ninth All-Star selection and the first time he was chosen to start. In his one inning of work, he allowed one hit and one walk with a strikeout and picked off Shohei Ohtani from first base, the first pickoff in an all-star game since Carlos Zambrano did it in 2008.

Kershaw made 22 starts in 2022, finishing with a 12–3 record and 2.28 ERA. Following the season, Kershaw again re-signed with the Dodgers, for one year and $15 million, with a $5 million signing bonus.

Pitching style

Kershaw's pitching style relies on deception, movement, and changes of velocity. He keeps the ball hidden so that it is hard for the batter to pick up the ball, and has a consistent overhand delivery on all of his pitches. He also consistently lands low on the strike zone below the catcher's knees, causing batters to chase the ball even when it is clearly going to hit the dirt. Out of the windup, Kershaw lowers his right foot vertically with a slight pause before moving it forward toward the plate. The motion was described during the 2015 National League Division Series as a "kickstand move," drawing a comparison with one setting a kickstand on a bicycle. Out of the stretch, he uses a slide step as it makes it difficult for a baserunner at first base to get a read on him. He has often said that he modeled his pitching mechanics after his favorite pitcher growing up, Roger Clemens.

As of late in the 2015 season, he is believed to be experimenting with the use of a cutter.

He is also known for having one of the better pickoff moves to first base and is considered one of the better fielding pitchers in the game. According to Al Leiter in the 2018 season, the average spin rate of his curve ball was listed to be barely above league average (2497 rpm, 2484 rpm league average), but he is still able to use the pitch effectively due to better control and location, and having similar release action to Sandy Koufax.

Preparation
As noted by many teammates, Kershaw is a perfectionist. Kershaw's former teammate and close friend, catcher A.J. Ellis, describes Kershaw's preparation and perfectionism during bullpen sessions prior to each start: 

Awards and accomplishments

Awards

Annual statistical achievements
Notes: Through 2017 season.  Per Baseball-Reference.com.

Personal life
Kershaw grew up in Highland Park, Texas and attended school with quarterback Matthew Stafford. In 2017 Stafford and Kershaw, members of the Highland Park High School class of 2006, were the highest-paid players in their respective leagues. One of his favorite players growing up was former San Francisco Giants first baseman Will Clark, and the main reason he wears number 22 is to honor Clark.

He is the great-nephew of astronomer Clyde Tombaugh, the discoverer of Pluto. Kershaw's mother, born Marianne Tombaugh, is the adopted daughter of Clyde Tombaugh's younger brother, Robert Tombaugh. His father, Christopher George Kershaw, was a musician and won a Clio Award for his work. The elder Kershaw remarried after his divorce from Marianne and died in 2013.

On December 4, 2010, Kershaw married his girlfriend of seven years, Ellen Melson. The couple have four children together. During the season, they reside in Studio City, California, and they live in University Park, Texas, during the offseason. Kershaw is a Methodist with strong religious faith, and shared his faith story in a 2012 video for the I Am Second series.

Kershaw made a cameo appearance in "Prince", a Season 3 episode of New Girl that originally aired following FOX's telecast of Super Bowl XLVIII.

Kershaw's nickname is "Kersh."

Humanitarian work

Before the 2011 season, Kershaw visited Zambia with his wife as part of a Christian mission organized by Dallas-based Arise Africa. After the trip, he announced his dream of building an orphanage in Lusaka, which he called "Hope's Home" after 11-year-old Hope, an HIV-positive child Kershaw met in Zambia. To accomplish his goal, Kershaw pledged a donation of $100 per strikeout recorded in 2011. With a then-career-high of 248 strikeouts thrown during the 2011 season, combined with additional donations through his Kershaw's Challenge organization, the initial $70,000 goal - later increased to $100,000 - was exceeded. When Kershaw won the 2011 Players Choice Award, he donated $260,000 to Hope's Home.

He and his wife returned to Zambia in 2012. Kershaw donated $100 for every strikeout in the 2012 season to Kershaw's Challenge, calling that season's incarnation of the project "Strike Out To Serve." Seventy percent of the money raised in 2012 went to Arise Africa, with 10 percent each going to the Peacock Foundation in Los Angeles, Mercy Street in Dallas, and I Am Second. In 2014, Kershaw continued to support the children of Zambia, in partnership with CURE International, raising funds to pay for 170 children's surgeries and new medical equipment for CURE hospital in Lusaka. Kershaw continued his partnership with CURE International in 2015, setting a goal of funding 100 surgeries for CURE's hospital in the Dominican Republic.

In mid-December 2015, Kershaw participated in an expedition to Cuba composed of MLB officials and players, including former Dodgers manager Joe Torre. It was the first visit by MLB since 1999, and one anticipated as an important step to help normalize relations with the United States that had begun to ease earlier in the year.

In addition to Hope's Home and Kershaw's Challenge, he has also helped with other programs in Los Angeles, such as helping Habitat for Humanity demolish and rehabilitate a house in Lynwood, California. He is also a supporter of the Peacock Foundation, which provides animal-assisted interventions and activities for at-risk youth by partnering with mental health practitioners, public service agencies and community organizations.

Since the 2013 season, Kershaw and his wife have hosted “Ping Pong 4 Purpose,” a charity ping-pong tournament at Dodger Stadium. The tournament raises money for Kershaw's Challenge and features past and present members of the Dodgers, high-profile celebrities, and team sponsors.

Author
Kershaw and his wife, Ellen, co-authored a book, Arise: Live Out Your Faith and Dreams on Whatever Field You Find Yourself'', about their Christian faith and humanitarian efforts. It was released on January 10, 2012, by Regal Press.

Endorsements
Kershaw is a celebrity endorser for Wilson Sporting Goods (glove), Muscle Milk, Skechers and Subway.

See also

 List of Los Angeles Dodgers no-hitters
 List of Major League Baseball annual shutout leaders
 List of Major League Baseball career ERA leaders
 List of Major League Baseball career strikeout leaders
 List of Major League Baseball career WHIP leaders
 List of people from Dallas
 List of World Series starting pitchers
 Los Angeles Dodgers award winners and league leaders
 List of Los Angeles Dodgers team records
 USA Today All-USA high school baseball team

References

External links

 Minor League Baseball bio
 

1988 births
Living people
Methodists from Texas
Baseball players from Dallas
Cy Young Award winners
Gold Glove Award winners
Great Lakes Loons players
Gulf Coast Dodgers players
Jacksonville Suns players
Los Angeles Dodgers players
Major League Baseball pitchers
National League All-Stars
National League ERA champions
National League Most Valuable Player Award winners
National League Pitching Triple Crown winners
National League strikeout champions
National League wins champions
Oklahoma City Dodgers players
Rancho Cucamonga Quakes players
Tulsa Drillers players
United States national baseball team players